The Armenia national badminton team represents Armenia in international badminton team competitions. The national team is controlled by the Badminton Federation of Armenia, the governing body of Armenian badminton. Armenia competed in the Sudirman Cup in 1989 and 1991 as part of the Soviet Union national badminton team. 

The Armenian junior team also participated in the BWF World Junior Championships mixed team event, also known as the Suhandinata Cup.

History 
Badminton was first played in Armenia in the 1980s when it was still under Soviet rule. After Armenia gained independence following the dissolution of the Soviet Union in 1991, the Badminton Federation of Armenia was established which then formed the national team in 1992. Armenia made its first international team appearance at the 1997 Sudirman Cup.

Men's team 
The Armenian men's team competed in the 2006 European Men's Team Badminton Championship. The team were placed into Group 1 with Denmark, Ireland and Iceland. The team lost all matches against Denmark and Ireland but managed to win a match against Iceland.

Mixed team 
The Armenian mixed team debuted in the Sudirman Cup in 1997. The team were placed into Group 8 with Lithuania, Estonia, Greece and Chile to compete for 55th to 59th place. The Armenian team lost 0−5 to Lithuania and Estonia but won narrowly against Greece and Chile to earn themselves 57th place on the overall standings.

Competitive record

Sudirman Cup

European Team Championships

Men's team

Junior competitive record

Suhandinata Cup

Mixed team

European Junior Team Championships

Mixed team

Players

Current squad

Men's team

Women's team

See also 

 Sport in Armenia

References

Badminton
National badminton teams
Badminton in Armenia